William Weigle (born May 25, 1940) is an American racewalker. He competed in the men's 50 kilometres walk at the 1972 Summer Olympics.

References

1940 births
Living people
Athletes (track and field) at the 1972 Summer Olympics
American male racewalkers
Olympic track and field athletes of the United States
Place of birth missing (living people)